The France national youth football team are the national under-21, under-20, under-19, under-18, under-17 and under-16 football teams of France and are controlled by the French Football Federation. The youth teams of France participate in tournaments sanctioned by both FIFA and UEFA and also participates in world, regional, and local international tournaments.

France national under-21 squad

France national under-20 squad

France national under-19 squad

France national under-18 squad

France national under-17 squad

France national under-16 squad

External links
 Official U-20 site
 Official U-19 site
 Official U-18 site
 Official U-17 site
 Official U-16 site

France national football team
Youth football in France